, better known by his stage name , is a Japanese actor. He is known for his roles as Dragon Eye Morrison in Electric Dragon 80.000 V, Kakihara in Ichi the Killer, Mamoru Arita in Bright Future, Hattori Genosuke in Zatoichi, Kenji in Last Life in the Universe, A man in Survive Style 5+, Ayano in The Taste of Tea, Temujin in Mongol, Captain Yugi Nagata in Battleship, Lord Kira Yoshinaka in 47 Ronin and Hogun in the Marvel Cinematic Universe, based on the Marvel Comics character. In 2016, he appeared as the Interpreter in Martin Scorsese's Silence. Three years later, he portrayed Rear Admiral Tamon Yamaguchi in Roland Emmerich's Midway (2019). He portrayed  the thunder god Raiden in the 2021 film Mortal Kombat.

Early life 
Asano was born in the Honmoku area, Yokohama, to artist  and mother Junko (順子). His maternal grandfather was Willard Overing, a U.S. citizen of Norwegian ancestry, whom Asano never met. Asano has an older brother, Kujun Satō, born in 1971, who is a musician and a partner in Anore Inc. (now Adonis A), a talent agency Asano and their father Yukihisa Satō founded.

Career 
Asano's father, an actors' agent, suggested he take on his first acting role in the TV show Kinpachi Sensei at the age of 16. His film debut was in the 1990 Swimming Upstream (Bataashi Kingyo), though his first major critical success was in Shunji Iwai's Fried Dragon Fish (1993). His first critical success internationally was Hirokazu Kore-eda's Maboroshi no Hikari (1995), in which he played a man who inexplicably throws himself in front of a train, widowing his wife and orphaning his infant son. He also worked with Kore-eda in the pseudo-documentary Distance in 2001. His best known works internationally are the samurai films Gohatto (aka Taboo, 1999) and Zatoichi (2003), as well as the critically acclaimed Bright Future.

Asano acted in Katsuhito Ishii's 2003 film The Taste of Tea, which premiered at the 2004 Cannes Film Festival. He appeared as the lead actor in Last Life in the Universe (2003) by Thai director Pen-Ek Ratanaruang and starred in Ratanaruang's 2006 follow-up film, Invisible Waves. In 2007, he starred as the young Genghis Khan in Sergei Bodrov's Oscar-nominated film Mongol. In Villon's Wife (2009), he played the part of an alcoholic writer, stating that, since he doesn't drink alcohol, he based his performance on people he knows. In 2011, he starred in the Marvel Studios film Thor as the Asgardian warrior Hogun, a member of the Warriors Three and companion to Thor. He reprised the role in 2013's Thor: The Dark World and 2017's Thor: Ragnarok. 

Asano appeared in the 2021 Mortal Kombat reboot as Raiden. In September 2021, Asano was announced as part of the cast of the FX limited series Shogun, adapted from the James Clavell novel.

In addition to his acting career, Asano directed commercial TV spots for his then-wife, Chara. He formed the band MACH-1.67 with director Sogo Ishii in 1996 and has also played in the bands Peace Pill and Safari. He is an artist and a model, most notably for Japanese fashion designers Jun Takahashi and Takeo Kikuchi, for whom he filmed a series of commercial spots directed by Wong Kar-wai, including the short film wkw/tk/1996@7'55"hk.net.

Asano and his father previously run the actor's agency Anore Inc. (now Adonis A), but they left since 2022. After he left the agency, he continued to support his previous agency.

Personal life 
Asano met J-pop singer Chara on the set of Iwai's Picnic (1994). They were married in March 1995 while Chara was pregnant with their first child, a daughter named Sumire, who was born on July 4 that same year. In 1999, they had a son named Himi. In July 2009, Chara announced on her website that the couple was divorcing. She received custody of both their children.

In August 2022, Asano announced his marriage to model Kurumi Nakata through his Twitter and Instagram accounts.

Awards 
Asano won the Most Popular Performer award at the 1997 Japanese Academy Awards for Acri and was nominated in the Best Supporting Actor category in 2004 for his performance in Zatôichi. He also received the Upstream Prize for Best Actor at the 2003 Venice Film Festival for his role in Last Life in the Universe. In 2014, he won the award for Best Actor at the 36th Moscow International Film Festival for his role in My Man.

Filmography

Film

Television

Video games

References

Bibliography 
 Morris, Jerome C. "I'm Not as Whacked Out as Dragon Eye Morrison" (interview), in Asian Cult Cinema, #54.

External links 

1973 births
Living people
Japanese male film actors
Japanese male television actors
Japanese male voice actors
Japanese people of American descent
Japanese people of Norwegian descent
Male actors from Yokohama
20th-century Japanese male actors
21st-century Japanese male actors
Best Actor Asian Film Award winners
Best Supporting Actor Asian Film Award winners